CNA2  may refer to:

Cornea plana 2
Highgate Airport